Fighting the World is the fifth album by the American heavy metal band Manowar, released in 1987 (see 1987 in music). This was the first Manowar album to feature artwork by long-time collaborator Ken Kelly, and also one of the first heavy metal albums to be recorded and mixed entirely on digital equipment (Turbo album, by Judas Priest, was prior to that). Since Fighting The World, all Manowar album covers have been painted by Ken Kelly.

The song "Defender" features a speech by American actor Orson Welles. The album was released 2 years after Welles died. The recording of Welles' speech was re-used from the original 1982 demo of the song.

Track listing
All songs written by Joey DeMaio.

Cover versions 
 "Fighting the World" was covered by German power metal band Mystic Prophecy as a bonus track on their album Regressus.
 "Black Wind, Fire and Steel" has been covered by Brazilian heavy metal band Immortal Choir, by Swedish punk band Venerea and by Spanish rock/punk band Reserva Dos, this last under the name "Viento negro, fuego y acero" (in Spanish).

References in popular culture 
 The cover is parodied in the Metalocalypse episode "Dethfashion". In the episode, Dethklok is visited by a sadistic fashion designer who is upset that their measurements for their fashion line were not reflective of their actual physiques. The designer used a cover of the band's previous album as a reference for his designs, and like the cover of Fighting the World, the band is standing shirtless on a pile of stones. The cover had been airbrushed to make the band members look much thinner and more physically fit than they actually were.

Personnel

Manowar
Eric Adams - vocals
Ross the Boss - guitars, keyboards
Joey DeMaio - 4 and 8 string bass
Scott Columbus - drums

Production
Richard Breen – engineer, mixing, Synclavier programming
Vince Gutman – digital programming, recording and mixing supervision
Howie Weinberg – mastering at Masterdisk, New York
Jason Flom – executive producer

Charts

Certifications

References

External links 
 Lyrics at Rawrix.net
 Official artist website

Manowar albums
1987 albums
Albums with cover art by Ken Kelly (artist)
Atco Records albums